The Minister for Fair Trading is a minister in the Government of New South Wales responsible for administering legislation and policy in relation to consumer affairs and SafeWork regulation in New South Wales, Australia.

The current minister is Victor Dominello since 3 August 2022, who also serves as the Minister for Small Business.

The minister assists the Minister for Customer Service and Digital Government administer their portfolios through the Customer Service cluster, in particular the Office of Fair Trading.

Ultimately the ministers are responsible to the Parliament of New South Wales.

Roles and responsibilities
The portfolio was established in December 1971 in the sixth Askin ministry and the major task of the portfolio was to ensure consumers were treated fairly. This was handled by consumer education, providing a complaints service, licensing some occupational groups, investigating prices and charges, responsible for weights and measures and landlord and tenant matters. The administrative units responsible to the Ministry included the Consumer Affairs Council and Consumer Affairs Bureau, the Weights and Measures Office, the Prices Branch and Registry of Consumer Claims Tribunals. The establishment of the Ministry also coincided with three entirely new acts of Parliament dealing with important aspects of consumer protection, namely the Consumer Claims Tribunals Act 1974, the Pyramid Sales Act 1974 and the Motor Dealers Act 1974.

The Fair Trading Minister is responsible for the regulation of occupations and professions including architects, building and construction, conveyancers, hairdressers, motor dealers and repairers, pawnbrokers, plumbers, property stock and business agents and tow trucks.

List of ministers

See also 

List of New South Wales government agencies

References

Fair Trading